Ian Storkey (born 14 September 1950) is a New Zealand cricketer. He played in one List A match for Wellington in 1975/76.

See also
 List of Wellington representative cricketers

References

External links
 

1950 births
Living people
New Zealand cricketers
Wellington cricketers
Cricketers from Napier, New Zealand